The 2018 Malaysia Premier League, known as 2018 100Plus Malaysia Premier League for sponsorship reasons, was the 15th season of the Malaysia Premier League, the second-tier professional football league in Malaysia since its establishment in 2004.

Team changes
A total of 12 teams contested the league, including 6 sides from the 2017 season, four relegated from the 2017 Malaysia Super League and four promoted from the 2017 Malaysia FAM League.

To Premier League
Promoted from FAM League
 UKM
 Felcra 

Relegated from Super League
 Felda United 
 Sarawak
 Penang
 Terengganu II

From Premier League
Promoted to Super League
 Kuala Lumpur
 Negeri Sembilan 
 PKNP 
 Terengganu

Relegated to FAM League
 ATM
 Perlis

Notes: 
   Originally Sime Darby were promoted along with UKM as finalists of the 2017 Malaysia FAM League final, but after Sime Darby announced their withdrawal from the Premier League participation, Felcra, the next highest team in the FAM League table, were invited as replacement.

   FELDA United were relegated to Premier League after failing to receive the FAM License to compete in the Super League; while T-Team were relegated to Premier League after their absorption to Terengganu, rebranding as Terengganu II and change of their status as reserve team to Terengganu. Negeri Sembilan and PKNP, 2 highest teams in the Premier League with FAM License, were promoted to Super League in their place.

Disbandment of Kuantan FA 
After failing to settle bad debt with former players for last season campaign, 4 months failing to pay current team wages. and unable to turn up for a league fixture against PDRM, FMLLP decided to disqualify Kuantan from the rest of the campaign. Because of their disqualification, all points that were won by other teams against Kuantan will not count and the league was left with 11 teams out of initial 12 with teams that were due to play Kuantan were given a bye week. It is the first time this has ever occurred in the professional level of Malaysian football where a team is disallowed to compete after breaking the rules and regulations with the season on-going.

Kuantan stated that Marcerra (the team that bought their license) wanted to take over the bad debts amounted to RM 3.5 million and clear all the overdue payment from last season. But it seemed fruitless as after 4 months into the league campaign, the problem was still unsettled as the current squad players decided to leave the team and opted to join teams in the FAM league. Kuantan were awarded RM 500,000 annual grant but minus RM 200,000 for fined after failing to complete their registration papers.

Stadium and locations

''Note: Table lists in alphabetical order.

Personnel and sponsoring

Note: Flags indicate national team as has been defined under FIFA eligibility rules. Players may hold more than one non-FIFA nationality.

Coaching changes 
Note: Flags indicate national team as has been defined under FIFA eligibility rules. Players may hold more than one non-FIFA nationality.

Foreign players
The number of foreign players is restricted to four each team including at least one player from the AFC country.

Note: Flags indicate national team as has been defined under FIFA eligibility rules. Players may hold more than one non-FIFA nationality.

Players name in bold indicates the player is registered during the mid-season transfer window.
  Foreign players who left their clubs or were de-registered from playing squad due to medical issues or other matters.

Naturalisation
Note: Flags indicate national team as has been defined under FIFA eligibility rules. Players may hold more than one non-FIFA nationality.

Notes: 
  Carrying Malaysian heritage.
  Participated in the Malaysia national team squad.

Results

League table

Result table

Positions by round

Season statistics

Top scorers

Players sorted first by goals scored, then by last name.

Top assists
Players sorted first by assists, then by last name.

Hat-tricks

Notes:
(H) – Home ; (A) – Away

Own goals

Clean sheets

See also 
 2018 Malaysia Super League
 2018 Malaysia FAM Cup
 2018 Malaysia FA Cup
 2018 Malaysia Cup
 2018 Malaysia Challenge Cup
 List of Malaysian football transfers 2018

References

External links
 Football Association of Malaysia website
 Football Malaysia LLP website

Malaysia Premier League
Malaysia Premier League seasons
1